Sohail Sangi is a senior journalist and activist of the leftist movement in Pakistan, presently working with the daily newspaper Dawn. He is one of the visiting faculty of the Mass Communication Department at the University of Sindh.

Early life
Sohail Sangi was born in village Janjhi of Tharparkar district, Pakistan in 1953. He did his M.A in English from University of Sindh Jamshoro in the 1970s. He was an activist of the left-wing students organisation Sindh National Students Federation during his student life.

Career
Sohail Sangi joined journalism in the mid 1970s. He was one of the pioneers of Daily Sindh News which was published under the editorship of Sindhi nationalist leader Shaikh Aziz in 1975 and later, also worked with Daily Ibrat, Daily Safeer, Daily Awami Awaz, and Daily Kawish.

Sohail Sangi also worked with Weekly Bedari and 'Weekly Sachai' with Ali Hassan.
He was founder of Daily Awami Awaz the first computerised newspaper of Sindhi language and Weekly Arsee. Sangi also wrote and translated six books on different topics.

Sohail Sangi has a reputation for being a pioneer of 'resistance journalism' in Sindh.

Sohail Sangi was arrested in July 1980 and he along with Jam Saqi, Nazeer Abbasi, Professor Jamal Naqvi, Badar Abro, Kamal Warsi and Shabbir Shar were tried by a Special Military Court in 1982-83 for bringing socialist revolution in Pakistan. He was declared Prisoner of Conscience by Amnesty International in 1984. Later he was released in 1985. After his release, he joined Daily Aftab Hyderabad, Sindh, Pakistan.

Sohail Sangi has helped introduce progressive activists in Sindhi media besides his other contributions in journalism.

He has been a freelance contributor of BBC Urdu.

References

External links
 Book Zameer ke Qaidi in Urdu compiled by Nisar Hussain and Jam Saqi
 Sindh Ji Shagrid Tahreek (Students Movement in Sindh)
 Peoples initiative for their rights in Urdu 
 Jail Diary of Badar Abro 
 Jail Diary of Shabbir Shar

1953 births
Living people
Dawn (newspaper) people
Pakistani activists
Pakistani male journalists
Pakistani socialists
People from Tharparkar District
Sindhi people
University of Sindh alumni
Writers from Sindh
Imprisoned journalists
Amnesty International prisoners of conscience held by Pakistan
Pakistani prisoners and detainees